John Olin (March 15, 1886 - October 8, 1920) was an American professional wrestler. He was a one-time World Heavyweight Champion.

Career 
John Olin was born in 1886. He started wrestling in 1904 at the age of 18. He was trained by the former European Greco-Roman Heavyweight Champion Tom Cannon. He wrestled his first match on July 14, 1904 against Ernest Roeber.

World Heavyweight Champion 
Olin was one of the earliest wrestlers in professional wrestling history and he was also one of the earliest wrestlers in the 20th century. He defeated Joe Stecher on December 11, 1916 in Springfield, Massachusetts to become the World Heavyweight Champion. He briefly held the World Heavyweight Championship. His reign ended on May 2, 1917 in Chicago, Illinois when he lost the title to Ed "Strangler" Lewis.

Death 
John Olin died on October 8, 1920 as a result of heart failure. He was aged 34 at the time of his death.

Championships and accomplishments 
World Heavyweight Championship (1 time)

References

1886 births
1920 deaths
American male professional wrestlers
Professional wrestlers from Massachusetts
Sportspeople from Boston
20th-century professional wrestlers